Tillus is a genus of beetles belonging to the family Cleridae.

The genus was first described by Olivier in 1790.

The genus has cosmopolitan distribution.

Species:
 Tillus elongatus Linnaeus, 1758
 Tillus notatus Klug, 1842

References

Cleridae